Killer Show is Nightmare's fifth studio album. It was released May 21, 2008 in three  different versions: one with just a CD; one with a CD+DVD; and a limited edition with a CD+DVD and a photo book. The album peaked at #5 in the Oricon Charts. The eleventh song, White Room, was released as a limited single download on their homepage.

Track listing

Single Information

Released: June 6, 2007
Peak Chart Position: #3
Used as the opening theme for the anime Claymore.

Released: October 3, 2007
Peak Chart Position: #4
DIRTY
Released: November 7, 2007
Peak Chart Position: #8
Used as the opening theme for the anime Majin Tantei Nōgami Neuro.

References

Nightmare (Japanese band) albums
2008 albums